Ympyrätalo (lit. "Circle House") is a circle-shaped office building located in the Hakaniemi district of Helsinki, Finland. The building is a local landmark.

History
Before Ympyrätalo was built, the block outlined by Siltasaarenkatu, Eläintarhantie and Porthaninrinne contained several wooden houses and a couple of stone buildings, such as the Wendt House which was designed by Gustaf Estlander and completed in 1903. All these buildings were demolished to make room for Ympyrätalo.

Ympyrätalo was designed by architects Heikki and Kaija Siren and work lasted eight years. It opened in 1968. It originally served as offices for Kansallis-Osake-Pankki. Outside the building are three booths that functioned as a drive-through bank until its closure in the 1970s due to low demand.

The building's architecture has been seen as a high point in 1960s Finnish office building architecture as other buildings of the decade, such as the Säästökulma building by Antero Pernaja, the Scandinavian Bank building and the Helsinki Telephone headquarters, were considered to be mediocre by comparison. At the same time Ympyrätalo, as well as the neighboring Kallio administrative building (1965) by the same architects, has been polarizing with its monumentality. Before completing these buildings the Siren architects had created a small stage for the Finnish National Theatre (1954) as well as being entrusted with the plans for the renovation of Helsinki Cathedral (1961–1963). The local architects went on to design important buildings in Paris, Japan, Austria and Iraq.

Ympyrätalo was renovated in the early 2000s to comply with modern technical and functional standards. The renovation project was completed in 2004. One of the architects responsible for the renovation was Jukka Siren, son of the Sirens who designed the building. The building's exterior, entrances, inner courtyard and stairways are protected by a zoning ordinance.

The building is currently owned by the insurance company Ilmarinen and tenants include an S-Market grocery store, an Alko liquor store, a Mehiläinen private clinic and a pharmacy.

Transport connections
Entrances to Hakaniemi metro station of the Helsinki Metro are located just outside Ympyrätalo. It has been suggested that the metro station could be directly connected to Ympyrätalo in the future but these plans have so far been postponed. Tram lines 1, 3, 6, 7 and 9 pass by Ympyrätalo. The nearby bus stops are serviced by numerous local and regional bus lines driving Hämeentie to and from the Rautatientori terminus, including bus 615 to Helsinki Airport.

Public art

Ympyrätalo features a minimalist sculpture called "The Symbol": a 3-meter steel ball designed by Hannu Siren, the son of the architects Heikki and Kaija Siren, and installed in 1985 to one of the building's entrances.

See also
 Otaniemi Chapel

References

External links
 
 Ympyrätalo official website

Buildings and structures in Helsinki
Modernist architecture in Finland
Office buildings completed in 1968
Office buildings in Finland
Heikki and Kaija Siren buildings
Hakaniemi